Lasius claviger, or the smaller yellow ant, is a species of ant belonging to the genus Lasius, formerly a part of the genus (now subgenus) Acanthomyops. Described in 1862 by Roger, the species is native to the United States.

See also
 Claviger beetle, a genus of beetles

References

External links

claviger
Hymenoptera of North America
Insects of the United States
Insects described in 1862